In enzymology, an agmatine deiminase is an enzyme that catalyzes the chemical reaction

agmatine + H2O  N-carbamoylputrescine + NH3

Thus, the two substrates of this enzyme are agmatine and H2O, whereas its two products are N-carbamoylputrescine and NH3.

This enzyme belongs to the family of hydrolases, those acting on carbon-nitrogen bonds other than peptide bonds, specifically in linear amidines.  The systematic name of this enzyme class is agmatine iminohydrolase. This enzyme is also called agmatine amidinohydrolase.  This enzyme participates in urea cycle and metabolism of amino groups.

Structural studies

References

 
 

EC 3.5.3
Enzymes of known structure